The Internet age refers to the time period since the Internet became widely available to the public for general use, and the resulting impacts on and fundamental changes in the nature of global communication and access to information.

The beginning of the modern notion of and current form of the Internet is considered by some to have occurred in late 1990 (though the internet was officially created a few years prior) when Tim Berners-Lee created what is now referred to as HTML code, and created what is generally considered to be the first genuine web page, which marks the origin of the World Wide Web.

History

Origins

The origins of the Internet date back to the development of packet switching and research commissioned by the United States Department of Defense in the 1960s to enable time-sharing of computers. The primary precursor network, the ARPANET, initially served as a backbone for interconnection of regional academic and military networks in the 1970s. The funding of the National Science Foundation Network as a new backbone in the 1980s, as well as private funding for other commercial extensions, led to worldwide participation in the development of new networking technologies, and the merger of many networks. The linking of commercial networks and enterprises by the early 1990s marked the beginning of the transition to the modern Internet, and generated a sustained exponential growth as generations of institutional, personal, and mobile computers were connected to the network. Although the Internet was widely used by academia in the 1980s, commercialization incorporated its services and technologies into virtually every aspect of modern life.

Access to the ARPANET was expanded in 1981 when the National Science Foundation (NSF) funded the Computer Science Network (CSNET). In 1982, the Internet Protocol Suite (TCP/IP) was standardized, which permitted worldwide proliferation of interconnected networks. TCP/IP network access expanded again in 1986 when the National Science Foundation Network (NSFNet) provided access to supercomputer sites in the United States for researchers, first at speeds of 56 kbit/s and later at 1.5 Mbit/s and 45 Mbit/s. The NSFNet expanded into academic and research organizations in Europe, Australia, New Zealand and Japan in 1988–89. Although other network protocols such as UUCP had global reach well before this time, this marked the beginning of the Internet as an intercontinental network. Commercial Internet service providers (ISPs) emerged in 1989 in the United States and Australia. The ARPANET was decommissioned in 1990.

Steady advances in semiconductor technology and optical networking created new economic opportunities for commercial involvement in the expansion of the network in its core and for delivering services to the public. In mid-1989, MCI Mail and Compuserve established connections to the Internet, delivering email and public access products to the half million users of the Internet. Just months later, on 1 January 1990, PSInet launched an alternate Internet backbone for commercial use; one of the networks that added to the core of the commercial Internet of later years. In March 1990, the first high-speed T1 (1.5 Mbit/s) link between the NSFNET and Europe was installed between Cornell University and CERN, allowing much more robust communications than were capable with satellites. Six months later Tim Berners-Lee would begin writing WorldWideWeb, the first web browser, after two years of lobbying CERN management.

By Christmas 1990, Berners-Lee had built all the tools necessary for a working Web: the HyperText Transfer Protocol (HTTP) 0.9, the HyperText Markup Language (HTML), the first Web browser (which was also a HTML editor and could access Usenet newsgroups and FTP files), the first HTTP server software (later known as CERN httpd), the first web server, and the first Web pages that described the project itself. In 1991 the Commercial Internet eXchange was founded, allowing PSInet to communicate with the other commercial networks CERFnet and Alternet. Stanford Federal Credit Union was the first financial institution to offer online Internet banking services to all of its members in October 1994. In 1996, OP Financial Group, also a cooperative bank, became the second online bank in the world and the first in Europe. By 1995, the Internet was fully commercialized in the U.S. when the NSFNet was decommissioned, removing the last restrictions on use of the Internet to carry commercial traffic.

As technology advanced and commercial opportunities fueled reciprocal growth, the volume of Internet traffic started experiencing similar characteristics as that of the scaling of MOS transistors, exemplified by Moore's law, doubling every 18 months. This growth, formalized as Edholm's law, was catalyzed by advances in MOS technology, laser light wave systems, and noise performance.

Cultural and global impacts
Since 1995, the Internet has tremendously impacted culture and commerce, including the rise of near instant communication by email, instant messaging, telephony (Voice over Internet Protocol or VoIP), two-way interactive video calls, and the World Wide Web with its discussion forums, blogs, social networking services, and online shopping sites. Increasing amounts of data are transmitted at higher and higher speeds over fiber optic networks operating at 1 Gbit/s, 10 Gbit/s, or more. The Internet continues to grow, driven by ever greater amounts of online information and knowledge, commerce, entertainment and social networking services. During the late 1990s, it was estimated that traffic on the public Internet grew by 100 percent per year, while the mean annual growth in the number of Internet users was thought to be between 20% and 50%. This growth is often attributed to the lack of central administration, which allows organic growth of the network, as well as the non-proprietary nature of the Internet protocols, which encourages vendor interoperability and prevents any one company from exerting too much control over the network. , the estimated total number of Internet users was 2.095 billion (30.2% of world population). It is estimated that in 1993 the Internet carried only 1% of the information flowing through two-way telecommunication. By 2000 this figure had grown to 51%, and by 2007 more than 97% of all telecommunicated information was carried over the Internet.

Most traditional communication media, including telephony, radio, television, paper mail and newspapers are reshaped, redefined, or even bypassed by the Internet, giving birth to new services such as email, Internet telephony, Internet television, online music, digital newspapers, and video streaming websites. Newspaper, book, and other print publishing are adapting to website technology, or are reshaped into blogging, web feeds and online news aggregators. The Internet has enabled and accelerated new forms of personal interactions through instant messaging, Internet forums, and social networking services. Online shopping has grown exponentially for major retailers, small businesses, and entrepreneurs, as it enables firms to extend their "brick and mortar" presence to serve a larger market or even sell goods and services entirely online. Business-to-business and financial services on the Internet affect supply chains across entire industries.

The Internet has no single centralized governance in either technological implementation or policies for access and usage; each constituent network sets its own policies. The overreaching definitions of the two principal name spaces in the Internet, the Internet Protocol address (IP address) space and the Domain Name System (DNS), are directed by a maintainer organization, the Internet Corporation for Assigned Names and Numbers (ICANN). The technical underpinning and standardization of the core protocols is an activity of the Internet Engineering Task Force (IETF), a non-profit organization of loosely affiliated international participants that anyone may associate with by contributing technical expertise. In November 2006, the Internet was included on USA Todays list of New Seven Wonders.

Societal developments caused by Internet

Political movements

Social networking
Social networking sites allow users to share ideas, digital photos and videos, posts, and to inform others about online or real-world activities and events with people within their social network. While in-person social networking – such as gathering in a village market to talk about events – has existed since the earliest development of towns, the web enables people to connect with others who live in different locations, ranging from across cities to the ends of earth (of course, one must have internet connection to do so). Depending on the social media platform, members may be able to contact any other member. In other cases, members can contact anyone they have a connection to, and subsequently anyone that contact has a connection to, and so on.

The success of social networking services can be seen in their dominance in society today, with Facebook having a massive 2.13 billion active monthly users and an average of 1.4 billion daily active users in 2017. LinkedIn, a career-oriented social-networking service, generally requires that a member personally know another member in real life before they contact them online. Some services require members to have a preexisting connection to contact other members. With COVID-19, Zoom, a videoconferencing platform, has taken an integral place to connect people located around the world and facilitate many online environments such as school, university, work and government meetings.

The main types of social networking services contain category places (such as age or occupation or religion), means to connect with friends (usually with self-description pages), and a recommendation system linked to trust. One can categorize social-network services into four types:

Viral marketing
Viral marketing is a business strategy that uses existing social networks to promote a product mainly on various social media platforms. Its name refers to how consumers spread information about a product with other people, much in the same way that a virus spreads from one person to another. It can be delivered by word of mouth, or enhanced by the network effects of the Internet and mobile networks.

The concept is often misused or misunderstood, as people apply it to any successful enough story without taking into account the word "viral".

Viral advertising is personal and, while coming from an identified sponsor, it does not mean businesses pay for its distribution. Most of the well-known viral ads circulating online are ads paid by a sponsor company, launched either on their own platform (company web page or social media profile) or on social media websites such as YouTube. Consumers receive the page link from a social media network or copy the entire ad from a website and pass it along through e-mail or posting it on a blog, web page or social media profile. Viral marketing may take the form of video clips, interactive Flash games, advergames, ebooks, brandable software, images, text messages, email messages, or web pages. The most commonly utilized transmission vehicles for viral messages include pass-along based, incentive based, trendy based, and undercover based. However, the creative nature of viral marketing enables an "endless amount of potential forms and vehicles the messages can utilize for transmission", including mobile devices.

The ultimate goal of marketers interested in creating successful viral marketing programs is to create viral messages that appeal to individuals with high social networking potential (SNP) and that have a high probability of being presented and spread by these individuals and their competitors in their communications with others in a short period.

The term "viral marketing" has also been used pejoratively to refer to stealth marketing campaigns—marketing strategies that advertise a product to people without them knowing they are being marketed to.

See also
 Markup language
 TCP/IP

References

External links 

 The Internet Society
  Living Internet, Internet history and related information, including information from many creators of the Internet

Internet
Information Age